St Olaf's Church (also known as Old Parish Church) is a Category B listed building in Cruden, Aberdeenshire, Scotland, dating to 1776. It is of Church of Scotland denomination.

The church's twin, conically roofed towers were added in 1833 by John Smith. According to historian Charles McKean, this "transformed this delightful church from an otherwise standard granite box kirk, customary birdcage bellcote topping the west gable, into a fantasy".

The interior retains the original 1834 pulpit, a 12th-century baptismal font and a 1519 Dutch bell.

Gallery

See also
List of listed buildings in Aberdeenshire

References

External links

Churches in Aberdeenshire
18th-century Church of Scotland church buildings
Category B listed buildings in Aberdeenshire
Listed churches in Scotland
Churches dedicated to Saint Olav in the United Kingdom